Shabnum Gul (Sindhi: شبنم گل) (born on July 5, 1963, in Dadu in District Larkana), is a writer who contributed 15 books on diverse subjects along with several Research papers on the different subjects. Shabnum Gul rendered valuable services in the field of education and served various colleges of Hyderabad region. She is working at present as an Associated professor and head of English department in Government, shah Latif College, Latifabad. She has served as a Secretary at Sindhi language Authority.

Early life 
Shabnum Gul was born on 5 July 1963 in Dadu in District Larkana, Sindh. Her family name is Razia Sultana but she is well known with her pen name Shabnum Gul. Her father Dr. Bashir Ahmed Lashari was medical officer and posted different places of Sindh. Her family is well read and well acquainted with folk wisdom, so that she continues that legacy in her writings. Her writings reflect true colors of soil and folk wisdom.

Shabnum Gul is prominent Author, scholar, and knowledgeable prodigy who has contributed marvelous work in literature. Her field of interests are psychology, parapsychology, mysticism, social issues etc. she has worked in different genre such as: short stories, poetry, columns, essays, travelogue, radio and television plays and novel. Her remarkable work is comparative studies of Shah Abdul Latif Bhittai and the western poets.

Shabnum Gul contributed 15 books on diverse subjects along with several Research papers on the different subjects. She started writing short stories and columns from a very young age and started her career as a freelance journalist and her columns, features, articles and critique were published in Sindhi, Urdu and English newspapers.

She is also radio, stage and television compare and conducted various literary stage programs till the present. 
Shabnum Gul rendered valuable services in the field of education and served various colleges of Hyderabad region. She is working at present as an Associated professor and head of English department in Government, Shah Latif College, Latifabad. She is current Secretary of Sindhi language Authority.

She is married to well-known historian, archeologist and author Ishtiaq Ansari and they have two children Arsum Ishtiaq Ansari and Areen Ishtiaq Ansari.

Education 
She received primary and secondary education from Sehwan, Johi and Jamshoro Colony. She did intermediate from Hyderabad Board of intermediate. After that completing graduation from Degree college Thatta. She did Masters in English Literature from English Department, University of Sindh in 1988. She did Masters in Political Science and L.L.B as well.

Career 
She joined as lecturer in English in 1991 at Govt. MB & GF Girls College. She served in Government Zubaida Girls College, Government girls degree college, Qasimabad, Govt. Shah Latif Girls College, Latifabad where she served as a head of the English Department for ten years.

She started to work as freelance journalist in Daily Aman Karachi in 1984. She did several interviews of prominent ladies belonged to various professions including art and literature. In 1987/88 she joined Ibrat group of publications.

She is serving as Secretary of Sindhi Language Authority since 2017

Books 
Shabnum Gul wrote various books, few of them are:

 Akhri Lafz (آخري لفظ) (poetry) Published by Sugand Publication Larkana. 1994.
 Unjatal shehar jo Naqsho (اڻ ڄاتل شھر جو نقشو) (short stories) Published by New Fields Publication, Hyderabad.
 Muhinjo sooraj mukhi (منھنجو سورج مُکي) (memoirs) Published by Roshani Publication, Kandiaro.
 Makhi Khan Moklani  (مکي کان موڪلاڻي) (Novel) Published By My Publication, Sukkur. 2015.
 Khali Hunj jo dukh (خالي ھنج جو ڏُک) (Short Stories) By Popat Publishing House Khairpur 2017.
 Khud Shanasi Jo Johar (خد شناسي جو جوھر) (Articles) By Sindhica Academy Karachi. 2019.
 Dard je Lae (درد جي لاءِ) (Poetry) published By Popat Publishing House Khairpur 2020.
 Piyaasi Lehren (پیاسی لہریں) 
 Khuwab Nagar (خواب نگر) 
 That-ul-Shaoor ki taqat (تحت الشعور کی طاقت)

See also 

 Sindhi literature

References 

Sindhi people
Pakistani novelists
Pakistani short story writers
1963 births
Living people